Christmas Time's A-Comin' is an album of Christmas music released in late 1994 by American country music singer Sammy Kershaw. His first seasonal project, it comprises a mix of traditional songs and newly recorded material. The title track, a bluegrass holiday standard written by Benjamin "Tex" Logan, charted in 1995 and 1998 on the Billboard country charts, respectively reaching #50 and #53 in those years.

Track listing
"We Three Kings (Part 1)" (John Henry Hopkins) – 0:53
"Christmas Time's A-Comin'" (Tex Logan) – 3:17
"White Christmas" (Irving Berlin) – 4:23
"Please Come Home for Christmas" (Charles Brown, Gene Redd) – 2:50
"Rudolph the Red-Nosed Reindeer" (Johnny Marks) – 2:35
"Frosty the Snowman" (Walter Rollins, Steve Nelson) – 2:47
"Daddy Stuff" (Rock Killough) – 3:59
"Winter Wonderland" (Felix Bernard, Dick Smith) – 2:01
"All I Want for Christmas Is You" (Troy Powers, Andy Stone) – 3:37
"Christmas Won't Be Christmas (Without You Here)" (Steven D. Cohen, Rick Lagneaux) – 3:36
"Up on the House Top" (Benjamin Hanby) - 2:26
duet with daughter Erin
"We Three Kings (Part 2)" (Hopkins) – 0:57

Personnel
From liner notes.

Musicians
 Mike Chapman - bass guitar
 Charles Cochran - keyboards
 Sonny Garrish - steel guitar
 Rob Hajacos - fiddle
 Michael Haynes - horns
 Sammy Kershaw - lead vocals
 Paul Leim - drums
 Sam Levine - clarinet
 Douglas Moffett - horns
 Farrell Morris - percussion
 Nashville String Machine - strings
 William Puett - horns
 Danny Parks - acoustic guitar
 Don Sheffield - horns
 Dennis Solee - horns
 Wayne Toups - accordion
 Pete Wade - gut string guitar
 Reggie Young - electric guitar

Backing vocalists
 Tracks 3, 4, 7, 9: Kim Fleming, Jana King, Lisa Silver, Louis Nunley, Bergen White
 Tracks 2, 5, 6, 8, 10, 11: Cindy Walker, Dennis Wilson, Curtis Young

Technical
 Buddy Cannon and Norro Wilson - production
 Charles Cochran - string arrangement
 Ronnie Thomas - digital editing
 Bergen White - horn arrangement (track 4), vocal arrangement (tracks 3, 4, 7, 9)
 Hank Williams - mastering

Chart performance

References

Sammy Kershaw albums
Albums produced by Buddy Cannon
Albums produced by Norro Wilson
Christmas albums by American artists
Mercury Records albums
1994 Christmas albums
Country Christmas albums